The 1st Foreign Regiment and the 2nd Foreign infantry Regiment are the original and most senior founding regiments of the Foreign Legion in the French Army.

The regiment is also responsible for running special institutions of the Legion. These include the magazine Képi Blanc, the Legion's Athletics Team (ATHLEG), the Legion Military Band, the Legion Museum and numerous other Legion initiatives.

The 1st Foreign Regiment is a Foreign Legion Command depot regiment. The regiment and all regiments of the Foreign Legion, differentiate, that their Legion Majors, Legion Adjudant Chefs and Legion Adjudants, form both a French and non-French (Foreign) elite composition.

History

Royal Foreign Legion 

Under the first restoration, the Bourbons would only retain the Swiss, in souvenir to their loyal service rendered to France during four centuries, and with them also, four foreign regiments out of which one colonial, formed of Spanish and Portuguese. The eight reorganized foreign regiments by Napoleon at the Hundred Days formed in 1815 the Royal Foreign Legion, which became the Hohenlohe Legion, then in 1821 the Hohenlohe Regiment. Licensed in 1830, the latter contributed to form the twenty first light, then the French Foreign Legion. The Swiss regiments of the restoration disappeared in 1830, nevertheless, the Swiss reincorporated again the French Army from 1855 to 1859 under the successive denomination of 2nd Foreign Legion and 1st Foreign Regiment.

Creation and different nominations

 On April 1, 1841 : creation of the 1st Foreign Regiment.
 1859 : merged with the 2nd Foreign Regiment and became the Foreign Regiment.
 1875 : became the French Foreign Legion ("Légion étrangère").
 January 1, 1885 : became again the 1st Foreign Regiment.

1st Foreign Regiment Pionniers 

The Legion retook since 1831 the tradition of Pionniers.

1st Regiment of the 1st Foreign Legion

1st Foreign Regiment of 1885 

The 1st Regiment of the Foreign Legion was created in 1841 based on 3 battalions in the newly created 1831 Foreign Legion. The 1st Regiment of the Foreign Legion became in 1855 the 1st Regiment of the 1st Foreign Legion. This regiment merged with the 2nd Foreign Regiment (2e R.E.), (1856-1861) in 1859 and became the Foreign Regiment (R.E), (1862-1875), then came the 1st and 2nd battalion of the Foreign Legion (L.E), (1875-1884) which produced the 1st Foreign Regiment of 1885 that consequently became the 1st Foreign Infantry Regiment 1er REI in 1922 and the 1st Foreign Marching Infantry Regiment (1er R.E.I.M) in 1943.

1st Foreign Regiment of 1856 

The 1st Foreign Regiment (1er R.E.) (1856-1861) was created based on the 1st and 2nd Foreign Regiments of the 2nd Foreign Legion.

1st Foreign Regiment of 1955 

The 1st Foreign Regiment (1er R.E) was created based on the recreated 1st Foreign Infantry Regiment (1946-1955). This 1st Foreign Regiment gave formation on September 1, 1972, to the Foreign Legion Groupment (G.L.E) which became the Foreign Legion Command (C.O.M.L.E) on July 1, 1984. With the Foreign Legion Command, the 1st Foreign Regiment constitute the Mother House of the Foreign Legion.

This expression inherited from Sidi Bel Abbès came from the primordial role the regiment played in conserving tradition and rendering the 1st Foreign Regiment a genuine turning plateau for the ensemble of the Foreign Legion. Quartier (garrison) Vienot of Aubagne and Sidi Bel Abbès were both named in honor of Colonel Raphaël Vienot. Aubagne also houses the French Foreign Legion Museum.

Created in 1841 and stationed in Aubagne since 1962, the 1st Foreign Regiment is the patron of all Foreign Legion regiments. Beyond this historical aspect, the 1st Foreign Regiment represents a major cornerstone in the career paths of legionnaires. The legionnaires initiate their careers from the 1st Foreign Regiment at the selection center of incorporation while also confirming successful return upon completion of basic training before deploying to a legion operational regiment. Legionnaires also pass by the 1st Foreign Regiment each time a posting of a regiment changes, and also finalize in the same regiment their departure formalities at the end of active duty service.

Missions of the 1st Foreign Regiment 

The 1st Foreign Regiment, is a regiment with essentially a combat and administrative vocation which major missions are the support of the Foreign Legion and directed by the Foreign Legion Command. However, during exterior and interior mission deployments requirements of units and regiments of the legion; the 1st Foreign Regiment usually also dispatches particular individuals or teams of specialists (O.M.L.T). In addition, the foreign regiment like all regiments of the French Army, does also engage in the alert phase mission of Vigipirate. The 1st Foreign Regiment also dispatches and supports world humanitarian missions around the globe during natural catastrophes and disasters.

History of the garrisons, campaigns and battles

1841 to 1852 

The 1st Foreign Regiment 1er was created in Aleria on April 1, 1841, from the first three Legion battalions.

On January 1, 1849, the 1er RE, under the command of Colonel Émile Mellinet, was in garrison at Oran in Algeria.

Second Empire 

On July 6, 1856, the regiment received the regimental flag colors "Emperor Napoleon III at the 1st Foreign" before initiating the campaign in Kabylie.

The foreign regiment first participated to the pacification of Algeria, then was funneled to the Crimean War where the regiment formed a brigade with the foreign brother regiment, 2nd Foreign Regiment 2e RE, at the corps of the 6th Division. The regiment participated to the Battle of Alma and to the Siege of Sevastopol. The regimental commander, colonel Vienot was killed in combat on May 1, 1855. The regiment participated to the apprehension of the Malakoff tower on September 8, 1855. The regiment then partcipiated to the Italian campaign in 1859, at the corps of the 2nd Infantry Division of the 2nd Army Corps of Patrice de MacMahon, Duke of Magenta, and illustrated capability during the Battle of Magenta. The regiment entered triumphantly in Milan liberated on June 7, 1859.

Returned to Algeria, the regiment was licensed on December 14, 1861, by Imperial decree. The men were accordingly transferred to the 2nd Foreign which changed name designation on January 1, 1862, to become the Foreign Regiment. During the Mexican expedition from 1861 to 1867, the foreign regiment embarked to Mexico where the latter arrived on March 25, 1863, at Veracruz. The 3rd combat company illustrated itself with distinction while sacrificing itself during the Battle of Camarón on April 30, 1863. The 1st and 2nd battalions participated to the siege of Oaxaca which capitulated in April 1865. The 2nd battalion lost on March 1, 1866, 102 men killed during the combat of Santa Isabel. On December 13 of the same year, the regiment left Mexico. During the Franco-Prussian War, the Legion engaged the conflict within delay. It was at the end of September 1870, that the regiment integrated the 15th Crops 1st Brigade, 2nd Division and was found making way towards Orléans (where the regiment refused 3 times consecutively the order to retreat and where foreign Lieutenant Kara, Peter I of Serbia illustrated capability) on October and December 1870 then at Montbéliard in January 1871, where he forced the Germans to leave the city.

1871 to 1914 

During the Paris Commune in 1871, the regiment participated with Armée Versaillaise to the semaine sanglante ("Bloody Week"). The commander-in-chief of the Armée Versaillaise was Marshal of France Patrice de Mac Mahon. The regiment then returned to Algeria in June 1871 (Mascara near Oran). On January 1, 1885, the "French Foreign Legion", named given to the "Foreign Regiment" on March 13, 1875, doubled in two foreign regiments constituted each of 4 battalions and one depot company. During the Expedition of Madagascar in 1895–1896, the foreign regiment with the 2nd Foreign Regiment, formed a Marching Battalion, which depended on the Algerian Regiment, of the Army of Africa under the orders of Colonel Oudri of the 2nd Foreign Regiment.

In 1881, the 1st Foreign Regiment was combat engaged in Morocco (combats of Chellaha of May 19) and South Oran (combat of Chott Tigri on April 26, 1882, where 300 Legionnaires faced 8000 dissidents). The 1st Foreign Regiment combat engaged in 1900 during the Battle of the Oasis, again in South-Oran and the Moroccan confines. On January 27, 1906, the 3rd combat company of the 1st Foreign Regiment crushed the enemy which participated to the combat of El Moungar (where the 22nd company of the 2nd Foreign Regiment had endured heavy losses, and which the battle was surnamed the "Cameron of the Sands").

At the beginning of 1883, the 1st and 2nd battalions of the 1st Foreign Regiment were sent to Tonkin. They apprehended Sontay on December 16, 1883. From January 26 to March 3, 1884, 600 men of Tuyen-Quang out of which 390 Legionnaires repelled 20,000 Chinese regulars.

In 1892, the 1st Foreign Regiment was engaged in Dahomey (Actual Benin) and disembarked at Cotonu on August 22. They combat engaged in September and October. 800 Legionnaires of Colonel Fauraux faced thousands of combatants and re-embarked victorious on November 17.

Between 1892 and 1894, the companies of the 1st Foreign Regiment intervened as well in Sudan. On July 1, 1893, the legionnaires of Lieutenant Betheder and Sergent Minnaêrt fought with ferocity at Bossé. They lost 60 killed and wounded which earned this heroic Sergent (who already distinguished capability at Tonkin) the decoration of the Légion d'honneur for his bravery under fire.

In 1895–1896, the regiment was part of the expedition which went on to the conquest of Madagascar. While combats were effective, climatic conditions were terrible and caused ravages. The losses through diseases were significant (200 dead). The Legionnaires exhausted themselves and gave their full without complaints. It was customary to say that in the Expeditionary Corps : " when a French trooper entered the hospital , it would be for repatriation, a Tirailleur would enter for medical treatment, and a Legionnaire would only enter for dying". The pacification debuted in 1895 and endured till 1905, date of permanent return of units of the 1st Foreign Regiment to Algeria.

The Moroccan époque debuted in 1906. In August 1907, Chef de bataillon (Commandant – Major) Provost was killed at Casablanca while repelling a violent attack. In 1908, the 1st Foreign Regiment 1er RE distinguished capability at Menabah. In 1911, the 22nd combat company of Captain Labordette endured the loss of 29 including their company commander at Alouana.

First World War 

The regiment was not directly combat engaged in World War I. However, the regiment continued to combat administer the institution and supply men for the ensemble of foreign units engaged in the conflict. In 1914, the 1st Foreign Regiment formed the constitution totality or most of the corps of many units.

In Morocco : The 1st Foreign Regiment 1er RE supplied the entire of the 1st Marching Regiment of the 1st Foreign Regiment, 1er RM 1er RE (constituted from the 1st, 2nd and 6th battalions). These units combat engaged for 4 years at the cost of 272 killed at Taza or Sidi-Amar. The 1st Marching Regiment was dissolved on February 15, 1918, and the battalions and mounted companies became autonomous.

In France: The 1st Foreign Regiment formed the corps constitution of the 2nd Marching Regiment, 3rd Marching Regiment and 4th Marching Regiment ("Légion garibaldienne") combat engaged in France, out of which the essential constitution was formed of foreign volunteers for the duration of the war (out of which the prominents featured tour de France champion François Faber, and poets Blaise Cendrars, Camil Campanyà or Alan Seeger). Between March and July 1915, the 3rd and 4th Marching Regiments disappeared after terrible losses. The 2nd Marching Regiment which was cited at 2 occasions was annihilated (1322 killed) with his foreign brother regiment 2nd Marching Regiment of the 2nd Foreign Regiment 2e RM 2e RE in September 1915 during combats of Navarrin. The survivors constituted the renowned Marching Regiment of the Foreign Legion (RMLE) which was entrusted to Colonel Paul-Frédéric Rollet. The RMLE would be the second most decorated unit of the French Army (after the Infantry Colonial Regiment of Morocco, actual RICM).

 In the Orient: A provisional regiment was formed of troops of the Army of Africa (France), with the title of 1er Régiment de Marche d'Afrique. The first two battalions were from the Zouaves, and the third battalion was formed of men from the Foreign Legion. This composite infantry battalion would be engaged with other units of the Corps expéditionnaire d'Orient in the Orient (firstly in the Gallipoli campaign in the Dardanelles, and thereafter on the Salonika front). The unit was originally formed of 2 companies of 1st Foreign Infantry Regiment (1er REI) and 2 companies of the 2nd Foreign Infantry Regiment (2e REI). The battalion headquarters company hailed from the 1er REI and the battalion commander from the 2e REI. Losing 815 men under fire, the Legion Battalion of 1er RMA was cited 3 consecutive times out of which 2 at the orders of the army before being disbanded on 30 September 1917.

In Tonkin, these attacks were led by Annamese agitators between August 1915 and July 1918. These action would repeat themselves until 1940. The 4th Battalion lost 216 men during this period.

Interwar period 

In 1925, the 1st Foreign Infantry Regiment 1er REI counted 10,000 men repatriated in 9 battalions (8 combat battalions and 1 training battalion, the 5th, 9 specialized companies, and the Communal Depot of Foreign Regiments (DCRE)).

The 4th Battalion forming a corps at Tonkin, rejoined by the 9th created in 1926. The battalion combat engaged Annamese agitators at the cost of more than 200 fatalities.

The 8th battalion and 24th company were in Syria. They combat engaged at Messifré and Soueida on September 12, 1925. The 8th battalion would be cited 2 times at the orders of the army (the first citation was obtained while they belonged to the 4th Foreign Infantry Regiment 4e REI, before becoming the 8th battalion of the 1st Foreign Infantry Regiment 1er REI).

The 1st, 2nd, 3rd, 5th, 6th and 7th as well the specialized units were in Algeria.

Rif War: the conquest of Morocco would require in several times the engagements of units of the 1st Foreign Infantry Regiment 1er REI and especially since 1918.

On August 9, 1918, the 2nd Mounted Company endured terrible combats mounting to 49 fatalities out which 2 out of exhaustion. Their chief, Captain Timm, severely wounded in the leg and in the face, attached himself to a mule to be able to continue his commandment and lead his men. On July 23, 1923, the 6th battalion attacked the Taghzout hill and lost 18 killed and 36 wounded.

The paroxysm of these interventions was reached in 1925-1926 during the Rif War. Four battalions (1st, 2nd, 6th, 7th) and two companies of sapeurs-Pionniers of the 1st Foreign Infantry Regiment 1er REI were engaged (almost 2000 men). At the cost of more than 400 fatalities, the battalions illustrated themselves in furious combats often in close range corps-a-corps combat. On June 10, 1924, the 6th battalion was decimated at the cost of 4 officers killed and 60 fatalities during an operation at night to liberate the post of Mediouna. The 2nd battalion chief, Commandant (Major) Deslandre was killed while leading at the head of his Legionnaires on July 18, 1924, near Tezual.

On May 8, 1926, the general offensive was launched. All the units of the 1st Foreign Regiment were of participation, in particular the 1st, 2nd and 6th battalions. Victory was definite on May 26. Nevertheless, Chef de bataillon (Commandant -Major) Le Roch was killed in violent combats on July 14 while leading the 1st Battalion at the tips of Tizi-N'Ouidel.

The four battalions were cited 5 times (out of which 2 citations for the 6th battalion).

Second World War 

In France: In 1939, the "1st Foreign" directed on France 2500 Cadres and Legionnaires out of the 3000 men, who formed the 11th Foreign Infantry Regiment 11e REI and 12th Foreign Infantry Regiment 12e REI. Three former regimental commanders of the 1er REI would command the 11e REI. These two regiments disappeared during the defeat of 1940 at cost of heavy losses. The 11e REI was cited at the orders of the army, the 12 e REI at the orders of the division.

In parallel, the 1st battalion of the 1st Foreign Infantry Regiment was transferred to the 13e DBLE which was on its way to Narvik.

In 1941, two battalions of the 1er REI and the company "hors rang" (CHR) constituted the 4th Demi-Brigade of the Foreign Legion (4e DBLE) sent to Senegal. The 1st Foreign Infantry Regiment 1er REI grew back in size by integrating the veterans of the 6th Foreign Infantry Regiment 6e REI whom fought in Syria.

In November 1942, the 1st Battalion of the 1st Foreign Infantry Regiment 1er REI illustrated capability during combats against the Afrika Korps in Tunisia. The 2nd company was annihilated in the Djebel Mansour and was cited at the orders of the army.

With the return of the 4th Demi-Brigade of the Foreign Legion (4e DBLE) to Sidi-Bel-Abbès and the beginning of the campaign of Tunisia in 1943, the 1st Foreign Infantry Regiment 1er REI became the 1st Foreign Marching Infantry Regiment 1er REIM on April 16, 1943. Formed of three battalions, the regiment illustrated combat ability at the cost of 380 fatalities by inflicting heavy losses to the enemy at Pont du Fhas and in the Djebel Zaghouan. For actions incurred, the regiment was cited at the orders of the army, a citation which currently adorns the regimental colors flag of the regiment. The veterans of the 1st Foreign Marching Infantry Regiment 1er REIM and 3rd Foreign Marching Infantry Regiment 3e REIM, would form again the renowned Marching Regiment of the Foreign Legion (RMLE) which participated in full to the total liberation of the national territory.

The 1st Foreign Infantry Regiment 1er REI ceased to exist on June 30, 1943. The respective missions were assured by the DCRE at Bel-Abbès.

Indochina War 

The 1st Foreign Regiment was reborn on May 1, 1946. The regiment participated along the various combat specialized units which would partake operations in which the Legion would lead until 1962 (notably the Mounted Saharan Companies). The regiment accordingly was fully dedicated to the selection, training/instruction of foreign volunteers, institution administration and funneling via the communal depot, general reinforcements for units engaged in Indochina. Accordingly, the regiment did not actually participate directly to the conflict.

On September 1, 1950, the Autonomous Group of the Foreign Legion (GALE) was created, commanded consecutively by Générals Jean Olié and Paul Gardy. This Autonomous Foreign Legion Group was the Commandment ancestor of the actual Legion.

Algerian War 

During the stir-up of "Events in Algeria", the 1st Foreign Regiment 1er RE, like all Legion regiments which lived in Algeria since 1831 would participate to combats which would last until 1962; the regiment endured the loss of 92 Officers, Sous-Officiers (Sergeants to Warrant Officers) and Legionnaires while placing out of combat 1151 rebels and recuperating 529 individual and collective arms.

 A couple of dates: November 18, 1954, death of Sous-lieutenant of the 3rd Marching Battalion in Djebel Orbata. On January 7, 1958, the 6th company of Center Instruction No 2 destroyed a band of rebels north-west of Franchetti. On March 5, 1961, the tactical general staff headquarters of the 1st Foreign Regiment 1er RE at the orders of battalion chief (Commandant -Major) Fournier was engaged in the region of Sebdou then Djilali. The section of student candidate sous-officiers of Adjudant Kemenceî responded to the rebels and beat 24, at the cost of 2 fatalities. On August 11, 1961, rebels infiltrated to Sidi-Bel-Abbès. Spotted, they entrenched themselves in a house. The Legionnaires of the 1st Foreign Regiment mounted the assault at the cost of 3 fatalities, out of Legionnaire Zimmerman would be last fatality in Algeria.

Departure: On September 29, 1962, the bodies of général Paul-Frédéric Rollet, Chef de bataillon (Prince) Aage de Danemark, and Legionnaire Zimmermann (representing the ensemble of Legionnaires whom died in Algeria) were transferred to the cemetery at Puyloubier (Bouches du Rhône). October 24, 1962, marked the continental departure ceremony at the Monument aux Morts (which was dismantled and repatriated to Aubagne). The black pavilions brought back from Tuyen-Quang in 1885 by Captain Borelli were burned in application of wishes to have them never leave Sidi-Bel-Abbès. October 26, marked the continental departure.

The 1st Foreign Regiment however would conserve units in the Sahara in virtue with the Evian accords (defense of a nuclear site). The last legionnaires of these Saharan companies would return to Aubagne in 1969 and would notably be garrisoned at Bou-Sfer (with the 2nd Foreign Parachute Regiment 2e REP and 1st Foreign Cavalry Regiment 1er REC leaving in 1967).

Since 1962 

On July 15, 1962, the precursors arrived at the camp de la Demande at Aubagne, which would become quartier (garrison) Vienot. Colonel Vaillant, regimental commander, disembarked with the regimental colors flag on October 26, 1962.

On April 29, 1963, the first Cameron eve night in metropolis had lieu. On April 30 was the inauguration of the Monument aux Morts repatriated from Algeria and the celebration of the centennial of the battle of Cameron with a military parade.

The Instruction Group of the Foreign Legion (GILE) garrisoned at Corte (Haute-Corse) and Bonifacio (South of Corsica).

In October 1969 : The Motorized Company of the Foreign Legion (CMLE) of the 1st Foreign Regiment was enacted in Corte. The Motorized Company was deployed to Chad at the occasion of Opération Tacaud. The company endured 6 fatalities in combat alongside the 2e REP until disengaging in 1970. The Motorized Company became the 6th company of the Operational Group of the Foreign Legion (GOLE) (created on March 9, 1971).

The 1st Foreign Regiment was split in two giving birth to the 2nd Foreign Infantry Regiment 2e REI, which recuperated the Instruction Group of the Foreign Legion and Operational Group of the Foreign Legion stationed in Corsica.

On July 1, 1981 : creation of the 31st Brigade, which the 1st Foreign Regiment 1er RE was part of. One unit was deployed to Lebanon within the cadre of the Multinational Force in Lebanon (FMSB) from May to September 1983 (Command element & immediate support, the value size of a company).

September 1990 to April 1991: The 1st Foreign Regiment engaged a Transport Platoon within the cadres of Opération Daguet in the Gulf.

Since 1991, the regiment has regularly supplied and reinforced units of the Legion deployed in exterior theatres of operations as well as interior missions (notably Sentinel since 2015).

Organisation
The regiment consists of three companies, as follows:

Pionniers Sections of Tradition
Compagnie de Commandement et des Services Régimentaire (CCSR) – Regimental Command and Services Company
Compagnie des Services de la Légion Étrangère (CSLE) – Foreign Legion Services Company
Compagnie Administrative du Personnel de la Légion Étrangère (CAPLE) – Foreign Legion Personnel Administration Company

It also runs the following:

Institution des Invalides de la Légion Étrangère (IILE) à Puyloubier – Foreign Legion Invalid Institution, at Puyloubier
Centre d’Hébergement et d’Accueil de la Légion Étrangère (CHALE) à la Ciotat – Foreign Legion Accommodation & Welcome Center, at Ciotat
Centre des Permissionnaires de la Légion Étrangère de la Malmousque (CPLEM) à Marseille – Foreign Legion Leave Center, at Malmousque

Also reported within the regiment is the Foreign Legion Emergency Staff and Statistics Division, a Legion intelligence section.

Tradition

Insignia 

The insignia of the 1st Foreign Infantry Regiment, (1er R.E.I), (1950-1955) retook the symbolics of the Foreign Legion with the grenade of 7 flames and the green, red colors of the legion. The regiment is represented inside the grenade while the globe commemorates the relic of the Foreign Legion in Sidi Bel Abbès.

The current insignia of the 1st Foreign Regiment, (1er R.E), retook the symbolic ruban of the Commemorative medal of the Mexico Expedition created in 1863. This insignia was initially destined for the 3rd company of the 4th Foreign Regiment 4e RE in 1936. The insignia became that of the Autonomous Group of the Foreign Legion, (G.A.L.E) and was then adopted by the 1st Foreign Regiment, (1er R.E.) in 1955.

The insignia makes reference to a white diamond shape on which figures the arms of Mexico (a black coloured Mexican golden eagle (Aquila chrysaetos), locking on a serpent, as depicted on the flag of Mexico) and a saltire with Foreign Legion and Mexican colors.

Regimental colors

Regimental Song 

Chant de Marche : Nous sommes tous des volontaires  featuring:
Nous sommes tous des volontaires,
Les gars du 1er étranger,
Notre devise est légendaire,
Honneur Fidélité – Fidélité,
Marchons légionnaires,
Dans la boue, dans le sable brûlant, (bis)
Marchons l'âme légère, (bis)
Et le cœur vaillant, (bis)
Marchons légionnaires. (bis)

Nous marchons gaiement en cadence,
Malgré le vent malgré la pluie,
Les meilleurs soldats de la France,
Sont là devant vous, les voici.

Partout où le combat fait rage,
L'on voit le 1er étranger,
Exemple d'héroïsme, de courage,
Se couvrir de glorieux lauriers.

Gardons dans le fond de nos âmes,
Le souvenir de nos aînés,
Et pour la grenade à sept flammes,
Loyal prêt à tout sacrifier.

Decorations 
 Legion of Honour on April 28, 1906
 Croix de guerre 1939–1945 (France) with 1 palm
 Gold Medal of the City of Milan since March 9, 1909
 Cross with swords of the Sovereign Military Order of Malta

Honors

Battle honours

 Sevastopol 1855
 Kabilie 1857
 Magenta 1859
 Camerone 1863
 Extrême-Orient 1884–1885
 Dahomy-Maroc 1892–1907, 1925
 Madagascar 1895–1905
 Orient 1915–17
 AFN 1952–1962

Foreign Legion and Regimental Commanders

Tenure (1841–1955)

Tenure (1955-present)

Notable members 
 Captain Jean Danjou
 Peter I of Serbia
 Captain Joseph Arthur Dufaure du Bessol
 Siegfried Freytag, German Aviation Ace
 Brigadier General Giuseppe Garibaldi II with his 5 brothers, 2 of whom were killed in combats at Argonne in 1915.
 Hermann Eckstein (1903-1976)
 Eugene Jaques Bullard
 Pierre Segretain
 Pierre Jeanpierre
 Peter J. Ortiz
 Serge Andolenko
 Louis-Antoine Gaultier
 Gabriel Bablon

Gallery

See also 

Major (France)
Swiss Guard
Moroccan Division
Marching Regiment of the Foreign Legion
List of French Foreign Legion units

References

Bibliography

Websites
www.legion-etrangere.com

External links
 
 Legion recrute
 Képi Blanc magazine
 1st Foreign Regiment's history - History & images of the 1er RE

French Army
Foreign Regiment, 1st
Military units and formations established in 1841
Foreign Regiment, 1st
1841 establishments in France